OK Mozart is an annual Classical music festival held each June in Bartlesville, Oklahoma, except 2020 when it was rescheduled for September. Considered Oklahoma's Premiere Music Festival, OK MOZART brings the highest quality professional musical and cultural experiences to the state of Oklahoma and the middle United States. The festival is a multi-day, multi-location event with professional orchestra musicians, concert artists and musical performances of artistic excellence for an event with international significance.

Featured Artists from Past Festivals
The first festival was held in 1985, and throughout its  years has featured World Renowned Orchestra Players and Conductors and Grammy Award Winning Artists. Some of the past performers include:
Ransom Wilson
Itzhak Perlman
 Robin Sutherland
 Joshua Bell
 The Canadian Brass
 Edgar Meyer
 Andre Watts
 Erica Kiesewetter
 Nadja Salerno-Sonnenberg
 Bela Fleck
 Gustav Meier
 Carolina Chocolate Drops
 Esperanza Spalding
 Jon Kimura Parker
 Miro Quartet

References

External links
 Festival Web Page

Music festivals in Oklahoma
Classical music festivals in the United States
Mozart festivals
Annual events in Oklahoma